Große Ohe (in its upper course: Seebach) is a river of Bavaria, Germany. At its confluence with the Kleine Ohe in Eberhardsreuth, the Ilz is formed.

See also
List of rivers of Bavaria

References

Rivers of Bavaria
Rivers of Germany